William Allison White VC TD (19 October 1894 – 13 September 1974) was an English recipient of the Victoria Cross, the highest and most prestigious award for gallantry in the face of the enemy that can be awarded to British and Commonwealth forces.

He was 23 years old, and a temporary second lieutenant in the 38th Battalion, Machine Gun Corps (part of the 38th (Welsh) Division), British Army during the First World War when the following deed took place for which he was awarded the VC.

On 18 September 1918 at Gouzeaucourt, France, when the advance was held up by enemy machine-guns, Second Lieutenant White rushed a gun position single-handed, shot the three gunners and captured the gun. Later he attacked a gun position accompanied by two men, both of whom were immediately shot down. He went on alone to the gun, killing the team and capturing the gun. On a third occasion when the advance was again held up this officer collected a small party and rushed the position, inflicting heavy losses on the garrison. Subsequently, he consolidated the position by the skilful use of captured enemy and his own machine-guns.  The full citation was published in a supplement to the London Gazette of 12 November 1918 (dated 15 November 1918):

In 1939, White was commissioned as a captain in the Royal Artillery, Territorial Army.

White married Violet Victoria Price, who died in 1956 after 35 years marriage.  He died in 1974, aged 79 at Wellington, Shropshire, and was cremated at Emstrey Crematorium, Shrewsbury.  He is mentioned on his wife's headstone in St John's Churchyard, Hildenborough, Kent.

References

Monuments to Courage (David Harvey, 1999)
The Register of the Victoria Cross (This England, 1997)

External links
Location of grave and VC medal (Kent)
 

1894 births
1974 deaths
People from Mitcham
Machine Gun Corps officers
Royal Artillery officers
British World War I recipients of the Victoria Cross
British Army personnel of World War I
British Army personnel of World War II
King's Own Royal Regiment soldiers
British Army recipients of the Victoria Cross
Military personnel from Surrey